The Kyrgyz Khanate, also Kyrgyz Ulus, is a medieval state of the Kyrgyz on the territory of the Tian Shan, which arose as a result of the consolidation of the Kyrgyz tribes in the 15th-16th centuries. The names Buruten, Burut Kara Kirgisen, Curgizi, Dasht-i Qyrgyz are found in European and Asian sources.

Periodization 
1470-1484 - Ulus in Moghulistan.
1484-1514 - Kyrgyz Khanate.
 1514 - Son of Ahmad Alaq - Sultan Said Khan founded the Yarkent Khanate.
 1514 - Tagai Biy founded the Kyrgyz Confederation.
 1514-1684 - Nomadic Confederation.
 1524-1580 - First Kyrgyz-Kazakh alliance.
 1575 - The Kyrgyz settled the Eastern Pamirs
 1598-1628 - Second Kyrgyz-Kazakh alliance.
 1684 - Kyrgyz divided into south and north.
 1572-1750 - Kyrgyz-Dzungar wars.
 1759-1779 - Kyrgyz-Kazakh wars.
 1785 - The first Kyrgyz embassy in the Russian Empire.
 1821-1832 - The Khanate of Kokand conquers the Kyrgyz.
 1832-1838 - Tailak Batyr revolt.

History

Kyrgyz Khanate 
After Timur's and the Timurids' continuous raids to the Northern and Central Tien Shan, the political supremacy in these regions gradually began to pass into the hands of Kyrgyz tribes. Part of Moghuls was based on Kyrgyz (Moñoldor tribe), part of Moghul aristocrats moved from Ala-Too region to Kashgar region. In 1484, the Tien-Shan Kyrgyz created an independent state.  At first (1484–1504), the Kyrgyz Khanate was ruled by Ahmad Alaq Khan.

The proclamation of Khan Ahmad , the second son of the formal Moghul Khan Yunus Khan, was necessary for the Kyrgyz to officially recognize his rule as Genghisids.  Ahmad Alaq I mercilessly destroyed the families of unruly rulers of tribes such as Arlat and Kaluchi.  His son, who inherited the newly created state from his father, was considered to be Sultan Khalil (1504–1508) the «Kyrgyz Padishah».

The possessions of the Kyrgyz in the fertile valleys of Tien-Shan are now called 15th century "Kyrgyzstan".  In 1508, Sultan Khalil was defeated in a battle with the forces of Kashgar-Moghul nobles led by Mansur Khan and his brother Mahmud Khan and fled to the Ferghana, but was captured by the local beg Janybek and executed.

Since then, the Kyrgyz tribes inhabiting the area of present-day Kyrgyzstan stopped choosing a Khan from the Moghul Genghisids and obeyed their ruler Tagai Biy (Muhammed Kyrgyz).

Union of Kyrgyz Tribes 
The Union of Kyrgyz Tribes — is the period of the Kyrgyz Khanate, when almost all the Kyrgyz tribes outside the borders of present-day Kyrgyzstan were united.

Founding of the state 

Part of the Kyrgyz defeated by Mansur Khan migrated to Turpan. the other retreated into the foothills. But after the departure of the enemies, most of them again moved to the Issyk-Kul region and the foothills of the Chuy Valley. in 1510 they completely dominated this territory. 

At the beginning of 1514, Kyrgyz tribes began to settle in the Issyk-Kul basin, which became the political center, from all sides, their unity was strengthened. The habitats of the Kyrgyz in the east reached Aksu, Karasahr, Turpan, in the south they reached Kashgar and Yarkent, in the west the Kyrgyz possessions rested on the foothills of Talas, and in the northeast they passed along the Ili River. Having gained independence, the Kyrgyz declared the far-sighted and fearless ruler Tagai Biy as their ruler. 

Since 1514, the name of Tagai Biy is increasingly mentioned in historical writings as the supreme ruler of all Kyrgyz tribes, in eastern sources he is mentioned as Muhammed Kyrgyz. For more than 20 years, he ruled the independent state of the Kyrgyz, created in the Tien Shan. Its capital was located near the modern city of Barskoon.

Kyrgyz-Yarkent war

Kyrgyz-Yarkent military alliance 
The Kyrgyz, led by Tagai Biy, in 1514 took an active part in the struggle between the Moghul prince Sultan Said and the ruler of Kashgar (Emir of the Dughlats) Mirza Abu Bakr Dughlat. This was facilitated by his alliance with the nomads, which arose even when Sultan Khalil was called the «Padishah of the Kyrgyz».

In the battles for Yarkent, Yengisar and Kashgar, the Kyrgyz army played a decisive role. For merits in these battles, Sultan Said Khan generously rewarded Tagai Biy, presenting him with a belt with a gold buckle, gold and silver bowls and jugs. As a result of the decisive actions of the Kyrgyz, Sultan Said Khan quickly restored the power of the Chagataids dynasty in Yarkent and Kashgar and revived the state in East Turkestan.

The Kyrgyz-Yarkent military alliance did not last long. The treachery of Sultan Said Khan and his entourage, their secret hostile actions and the desire to get the lands of the Kyrgyz contributed to its disintegration.

Kyrgyz-Yarkent war 

Tagai Biy always supported the Kazakh khans, who sought to capture the cities on the coast of the Syr Darya. He even made several trips to Andijan, Aksy, Sayram, Tashkent, Turkistan against the Khanate of Bukhara. In one of these campaigns, the Kyrgyz army captured Shaybani Khan's brother Abdulla (Kuchum Khan's son). He was the governor (bek) of the city of Turkistan. Having honored him as a descendant of the khan, Tagai Biy freed Abdullah from captivity a few days later. These actions of the Kyrgyz ruler did not please the Yarkent Khan Sultan Said Khan. Having openly declared that Tagai Biy was a traitor, in the autumn of 1517 he invaded the Kyrgyz possessions. In order to justify himself, Sultan Said Khan declared this attack a holy war against the «gentiles» - the Kyrgyz, who are plundering neighboring Muslim countries.

He wanted to suddenly attack Tagai Biy's headquarters under the cover of night. The battle took place on a spacious plain in the lower reaches of the Barskoon River. In this battle, the enemies prevailed, Tagai Biy was captured. In order to completely subdue the courageous and freedom-loving Kyrgyz, their ruler Tagai Biy was taken to Kashgar, to the Khan's horde as an honorary prisoner. He was in a foreign land for 5 years.

The last years of the reign of Tagai Biy

Five years later, in 1522, taking into account the prevailing historical situation, the Sultan Said Khan released Tagai Biy from prison. Thus, the Yarkent rulers wanted to attract the Kyrgyz to their side. But their attempts were in vain. And, especially since Tagai Biy himself did not agree with this.Tagai Biy, having taken a clearer position, managed to rally all the Kyrgyz around him. Later, the number of his troops grew at the expense of the Kazakh and other Turkic tribes. At that time, the son of Sultan Said Khan Abdurashid Khan (the Kyrgyz called him «Ireshe Khan») already ruled the Kyrgyz, and his headquarters was in the Kochkor valley. The Khan himself visited him every year and noticed how the position and authority of Tagai Biy was strengthening every day. In 1524, in Kochkor, the Kazakh Khan Taiyr met with Tagai Biy. The main subject of negotiations was the question of joint actions for the freedom of the fraternal peoples from the Yarkent conquerors. 

This event could not go unnoticed by the Yarkents. During his last visit to the territory of Kyrgyzstan, Sultan Said Khan was surprised by the strength and power of the Kyrgyz commander Tagai Biy. And returning to Kashgar, he makes the final decision to isolate the recalcitrant Kyrgyz hero, who began to fight openly against the Yarkent Khanate. In 1526, Sultan Said Khan again captured Tagai Biy and again sent him to Kashgar, where he was held until his death.

Eshtek Biy
Eshtek Biy was the grandson of Tagai Biy. He took an active part in the war against the emir of the Dughlats, Mirza Abu Bakr Dughlat. Eshtek Biy waged wars against the Oirats with varying success, he is also the ancestor of the modern Kyrgyz tribe of Solto. 

Eshtek Biy supported Haqnazar in the civil war in the Kazakh Khanate. The Kyrgyz troops under his leadership made campaigns against Ak Mechit and Ak Chiy. 

Eshtek Biy made a significant contribution to the conquest of the Eastern Pamirs by the Kyrgyz, from the second half of the 16th century there are more and more references to the Kyrgyz in this region.

First Kyrgyz-Kazakh military alliance

Haqnazar Khan
Even under Tagai Biy, the Kyrgyz Confederation entered into an alliance with the Kazakh Khanate, in 1524 diplomatic relations between the Kazakhs and the Kyrgyz were established for the first time. The alliance created by Tagai Biy and Taiyr Khan against the Yarkent Khanate greatly alarmed Sultan Said Khan. 

After the death of Tagai Biy, the formation of a political union of the Kyrgyz and Kazakhs is observed. In Muslim sources, the ruler of the Kazakh Khanate, Haqnazar Khan, is even called «The sovereign of the Kazakh and Kyrgyz». The political unification of the Kyrgyz and Kazakhs contributed to their successful struggle against the Khanate of Bukhara and the Yarkent Khanate, which sought to seize the nomad camps of the Kyrgyz and Kazakhs. 

The political unification of the Kyrgyz and Kazakhs became a serious opposing force against the Oirats, who sought to gain access to Central Asian trade.

Pamir Kyrgyz

The settlement of the Eastern Pamirs, or the modern Gorno-Badakhshan region of Tajikistan and the Sarikol Range by the Kyrgyz was first recorded in the second half of the 16th century. When the Emir of Bukhara Abdullah Khan conquered Badakhshan, Shugnan and Rushon, the local Kyrgyz managed to defend their independence and Abdullah Khan recognized their rights to the Eastern Pamirs.

Second Kyrgyz-Kazakh military alliance

Esim Khan

 
The second Kyrgyz-Kazakh military alliance, which was headed by the Kazakh Khan Esim, was aimed at the joint struggle of the Kazakhs and Kyrgyz against the Oirats and Khanate of Bukhara. Esim Khan sought to strengthen the fraternal relations of the Kyrgyz and Kazakhs, in this matter he was assisted by the Kyrgyz leaders Manap Biy and Kokum Biy. The Khanate of Bukhara had to recognize the power of the Kyrgyz and Kazakh feudal lords in the cities of the Syr Darya, and the invasions of the Oirats were successfully repelled. As a result of the joint actions of the Kyrgyz and Kazakhs, the Oirats had to retreat to Siberia.

Manap Biy and Kokum Biy
Manap Biy was one of the founders of the second Kyrgyz-Kazakh alliance, he ruled the Kyrgyz who lived in the Chüy valley, Issyk-Kul and the Central Tien Shan, his co-ruler was Kokum Biy, who ruled the Kyrgyz in Talas, Chatkal and Aksy. 
 
Manap Biy commanded a 10,000-strong army that defended the Kyrgyz-Kazakh border from Oirats. During the clashes, the Kyrgyz and Kazakhs defeated the Oirats, and after a decisive battle in 1625 on the banks of the Ili River, the Oirats were forced to retreat to Siberia.
 
Kokum Biy was the co-ruler of Manap Biy and ruled the southern Kyrgyz, while Manap Biy ruled the northern ones. Manap Biy and Kokum Biy strengthened the kinship relations of the southern and northern Kyrgyz. Esim Khan also appointed Kokum Biy as the governor of Tashkent.

Tileke Biy
In 1609-1610, the cities of Aksu and Uqturpan in East Turkestan were plundered together with Botokara Biy with 5000 Kyrgyz thousand soldiers. However, when the Yarkent troops led by Timur Sultan pursued him, he left Botokara's troops and remained in the fort for a year, observing the progress of the battle. 3,000 soldiers led by Botokara fought with the pursuers, 2,000 Kyrgyz soldiers were killed, and 1,000 soldiers led by Botokara were captured. After that, Tileke Biy belt around his neck and came to Timur sultan asking for forgiveness. Timur Sultan heard about the death of his grandfather Muhammad Khan from Tileke Biy and let them go.

In the 1620s, the Kyrgyz troops devastated the Shahnaz settlement. The Yarkent Khan sent a detachment to pursue them, but the Kyrgyz, setting up an ambush, defeated the enemy.

Koisary Biy
During the reign of Koisary Biy, Khan Abdallah made an attempt to take possession of the Kyrgyz city of Kara-Syr, after he took the cities, he returned back. The following year, he organized a campaign in Osh, after the capture of the city, the Yarkent troops began to move back along a different route. Many significant Yarkent rulers took part in the campaign. The ruler of Aksu Kazi-Shah Bek, the ruler of Uqturpan Mirza Kuchuk Bek, the ruler of Kuqa Abd al-Kakhar Bek, the ruler of Kelfin Hadji Bek, the ruler of Bai Khan-kuli Bek - these Beks and the entire army led by Kazi Muhammad-Zakir- Khoja moved together with Abdallah.

Koisary Biy gathered an army and began pursuing the Yarkent army. Kyrgyz troops overtook the Yarkent army in the area of Bei-Buinak. After a six-day battle, the Kyrgyz gained the upper hand. Koisary Biy captured Kazi Shah Bek and Khan-Kuli Bek, and Abd al-Kakhar Bek and Kuchuk Bek were killed. 

Despite the defeat, Abdallah was plotting another campaign against the Kyrgyz. Abdallah defeated the Kyrgyz at the Naryn River, but he was overtaken at Aksai. Thus, Abdallah Khan's campaigns were not very successful. 

During his reign, the Kyrgyz Confederation had a significant impact on the Yarkent Khanate. For example, the city of Yengisar was under the ruler of Satym Biy, the Kyrgyz rulers owned the cities of Khotan, Yarkent, Kashgar, Yengisar, and so on. Abdallah Khan himself appointed the Kyrgyz as the rulers of these cities.

War against Dzungar Khanate

The first major campaign of the Dzungarian troops against the Kyrgyz and Kazakhs took place in 1643. Then the Dzungars moved to Tashkent and Turkistan, but the combined forces of the Kyrgyz, Kazakhs and Uzbeks inflicted a major defeat on the Dzungars in the Battle of Orbulaq, however, the united forces did not dare to pursue the defeated Dzungars, which made it possible for Erdeni Baturto temporarily gain a foothold on the captured lands.

The next campaign of the Dzungars against the Kyrgyz and Kazakhs happened in 1652, the Dzungarian army managed to inflict a serious defeat on the Kyrgyz and Kazakhs, the Kazakh Khan Jangir was killed during the battle. 

In 1653, the founder of the Dzungar Khanate, Erdeni Batur, died, the Khanate of Bukhara took advantage of this by sending a 38,000-strong army to the Talas Valley and, with the support of the Kyrgyz and Kazakhs, entered into battle with the Dzungar army in the area of ​​Khulan Jilan, however, during the battle, a commander of Bukhara army was killed. Which forced the Bukhara army to retreat with heavy losses.

In 1678, the new ruler of the Dzungar Khanate, Galdan Boshugtu, began a new wave of campaigns in East Turkestan and Central Asia. 

After the capture of Yarkent (1680), Galdan made campaigns in the territory of modern Southern Kyrgyzstan and neighboring regions of Uzbekistan for several years. In 1681 and 1683, he unsuccessfully made an attempt to capture Sayram, in the fall of 1683 he went on a campaign to Andijan in order to conquer the Kyrgyz nomads there, but was defeated. In 1684, having gathered new forces, he plundered Osh and moved to Andijan, but, having met fierce resistance from the Kyrgyz and Uzbeks, he was forced to retreat. In the autumn of 1685, he made his last unsuccessful attempt to capture Andijan. 

Although the Dzungars failed to conquer the Kyrgyz, the devastating campaigns caused serious damage to the Kyrgyz, the northern tribes were forced to migrate to the Ferghana valley, which later led to the disintegration of the confederation to the south and north.

Teyish Khan

Teyish Khan or Kanteyish. In the middle of the 17th century, the Union of Kyrgyz Tribes, the Kazakh Khanate  and the Khanate of Bukhara could not withstand the onslaught of the Dzungar Khanate, which led to the displacement of the allied forces from the Tien Shan. 

In the 1670s, the Kyrgyz gathered their strength and elected Teyish as their Khan. Teyish Khan made an alliance with the Kazakh Khan Tauke. In 1680, Kyrgyz troops invaded the Yarkent Khanate and captured the cities of Kashgar and Yarkent, but were forced to retreat due to the onslaught of the Dzungar Khanate.

Kudayan Khan

The period of his reign was a difficult time for the Kyrgyz. Unable to withstand the onslaught of the Dzungar Khanate, the Kyrgyz were forced into the Ferghana valley, which led to the final disintegration of the confederation of the Right and Left wings of the Kyrgyz. 

According to legend, the sage Sanchi put the Khan to the test, and then openly admitted that he was not satisfied with the results. Kudayan hit him in anger, for which he was cursed.

According to historical information, Kudayan Khan died in Khojent. After that, Mamatkul Biy, having united the Kyrgyz who came to Ferghana, settled them in the upper reaches of Namangan.

North Kyrgyz Tribes

After 1684, the two wings of the Kyrgyz Tagai (Right Wing) and Adyghene (Left Wing) ceased to be united and continued to exist independently of each other. The right wing occupied the north of modern Kyrgyzstan, and the left - the South.

Mamatkul Biy

After losing to the Dzungars, the Kyrgyz were forced to migrate to the Ferghana Valley in the 1680s. Mamatkul Biy united the Kyrgyz tribes and settled them in the regions of Namangan. 

Since the 1720s, Kyrgyz troops began liberation campaigns in the territory of Northern Kyrgyzstan. As a result of these campaigns, by 1758 the entire territory of Northern Kyrgyzstan was liberated, the Kyrgyz troops liberated Chuy, Naryn, Talas and Issyk-Kul. 

The Kyrgyz began to make raids on the territory of East Turkestan, but in 1758 the Dzungar Khanate was captured by the Qing dynasty. The first clashes with the Qing dynasty began as early as 1757, when the troops of the Qing general Zhao Hui attacked the Sayak tribe, but, having met fierce resistance, were forced to retreat. The Qing ambassadors offered to transfer the Kyrgyz to Qing citizenship, Mamatkul Biy held a meeting with the ambassadors in Issyk-Kul.

In 1758, in connection with the arrival of Qing ambassadors, to clarify the borders of the Qing state, Mamatkul Biy sent his embassy to China, consisting of 7 people: Cherikchi Biy (head of the embassy), Sherbek Batyr, Tulkyu Biy, Nyshaa Batyr, Akbai Batyr, Notsi Biy and Shukur Biy. In the same year, the delegates were at the reception of the Qing Emperor Qianlong and resolved political and border issues. They demanded the return of the occupied lands, and the emperor promised to look into these issues. But even before these demands were met, the Kyrgyz themselves completely liberated their lands by force.

Cherikchi Biy

The reign of Cherikchi Biy was short-lived; in 1758 he headed the Kyrgyz embassy to the Qing dynasty. He openly told Emperor Qianlong that he opposed the annexation of the Kyrgyz to the Qing dynasty.

In 1760 he defeated the qing army, which invaded Issyk-Kul.

Jayil Biy

Jayil Biy spent his youth in the Fergana Valley, where he learned agriculture and all the advantages of a settled life, in the future he shared this knowledge with his relatives and even opened a school where there were teachers from Andijan, Namangan and Kokand. 

He also actively participated in the wars against the Dzungars, for his exploits he received the title "Batyr". So he inflicted a heavy defeat on the Dzungars in the Merke region, which forced them to flee to their lands. 

However, after the Dzungars, the new opponents of the Kyrgyz became the Kazakhs, who claimed Kyrgyz pastures and pastures. The first clashes began as early as 1759, when the Kazakh sultans began to raid Kyrgyz nomad camps. In 1764, the campaign of the Kazakhs ended unsuccessfully and 17 sultans, led by Ablai Khan, were captured. The future Khan Sadyr insisted on their execution, but Jayil decided to spare them, because he thought that this would lead to a big war, which later became a fatal mistake in his life. 

Ablai Khan did not keep his word about peace and began to make new raids in 1765 and 1769, but the largest campaign began in 1775. 30,000 troops invaded the Kyrgyz territories, plundering everything in their path, the decisive battle took place on the plain between the rivers Ak-Suu and Kyz-Tuugan. The numerical superiority of the Kazakhs played a role, the two armies were very tired, Jayil Biy ordered the army to cross the river, which led to an incomplete defeat of the Kyrgyz. 

Ablai Khan understood that this victory was only the result of surprise and that Jayil was able to strike back, Ablaiwanted to eliminate Jayil by all means and decided to take an insidious act. 

The next day, Jayil Biy was executed along with his sons, he had the opportunity to choose who to grant freedom, and he chose those who still had no children so that their family would not stop. 

In 2005, in memory of the glorious son of the Kyrgyz people, one of the streets in the new building "Archa-Beshik" was named after Jayil Batyr. 

On October 18, 2006, an impressive monument was erected on the grave of Jayil Batyr and his sons. 

November 10, 2012 in the city of Kara-Balta, in honor of the 20th anniversary of the Jayil district of the Chuy region, a monument to Jayil Batyr and a cultural center were opened.

Sadyr Khan
In his youth, he participated in the wars against the Dzungars, for which he received the title "Batyr", Sadyr received wide fame among the people and had great authority for his military achievements. 
 
In 1759, the Kazakh sultans attacked the Kyrgyz territories for the first time, in 1764 Sadyr Batyr, who was not yet a khan at that time, immediately led 3 successful punitive campaigns against the Kazakh camps in the Ili River. The Kazakh Khan Ablai was captured by the Kyrgyz in 1764 and 1771, Sadyr Batyr always insisted on his execution, but the peace-loving Jayil Biy let Ablai go, for which he later paid with his life. 
 
After the death of Jayil Biy in 1774, Sadyr Batyr was elected as the Unified Biy, according to the results of the vote. He wanted to completely reform the state system and in the same year declared himself khan. He also built his fortress Sadyr-Korgon on the territory of modern Talas, which became the capital of the state. 
 
However, the rulers of other tribes did not like that their power over their tribes was henceforth limited, which led to growing opposition. In 1777 he led a campaign against the Kazakhs and captured the city of Shymkent, Cholok-Korgon, Sozak and devastated the nomad camps of the Kazakh tribe Botbay in the area of ​​Koshogonun-Kökjar. In response to this, Ablai Khan led a campaign against the Kyrgyz in 1779-1780, deciding to use a trick. He spread false information that the Russian Empire and the Qing dynasty provide military assistance to the Kazakhs, the Kyrgyz troops were forced to split into 3 groups. Thus, the Atake Biy group of troops guarded the borders from the side of Ili, the Esenkul Biy group of troops guarded the borders from the side of Kashgar, and Sadyr Khan himself remained with small forces, which led to his defeat. After the defeat, Sadyr Khan was executed along with his sons, and Atake Biy was elected as the new leader.

Atake Biy

Atake Biy was born in 1737 in the districts of Andijan, from an early age he was smart and interested in military art. 
 
Kyrgyz troops under the leadership of Atake Biy conducted a number of successful campaigns in Northern Kyrgyzstan. In the decisive battle on the pasture of Kök-Jar Atake Biy defeated the Dzungarian army and executed their leader. 
 
After the wars with the Kazakhs, Atake Biy realized that the Kyrgyz no longer had allies, and decided to convene a Kurultai. Many issues were discussed, but the most important thing was to establish ties with the Russian Empire. Atake Biy said that if we are surrounded by strong enemies, then we need a strong ally, some Biys opposed this, but in the end it was decided to send an embassy to the Russian Empire. 

 
In 1785-1787, the Kyrgyz embassy conducted a successful diplomatic mission in the Russian Empire, which resulted in the establishment of trade relations and so on. The ambassadors were handed a letter of return on behalf of Empress Catherine, in which it was reported that she was accepting a request for friendship between the Russian and Kyrgyz state.

Esenkul Biy
Esenkul Biy was elected the Unified Biy after the death of Atake Biy in 1787. Esenkul Biy had wide authority among the people for his military achievements. 

In 1771, the Sultan of the Middle Zhuz of the Kazakhs, Kokjal Barak, attacked the Kyrgyz. Having reached Kochkor, he entered into battle with the small army of Esenkul Biy, the Kazakh army of 17,000 was completely defeated, and the Sultan was executed. Pursuing the remnants of the Kazakh army, the Kyrgyz troops under the leadership of Esenkul Batyr devastated the Kazakh nomad camps in the Ili valley. There is information about this in the Russian archives. 

 

In 1785-86. Kazakh sultan Berdikojo attacked the Kyrgyz. And again, under the command of Esenkul Batyr, the Kyrgyz defeated the Kazakhs, and Berdikojo was killed. In 1786, an agreement on reconciliation was reached between the Kazakh sultan Kankojo and the leaders of the Kyrgyz, Esenkul Batyr and Atake Biy. 

 Esenkul biy is also the grandfather of Ormon Khan.

Bürgö Khan

Bürgö Khan was born in the Talas valley. For his exploits and heroism during the wars, he received wide popularity among the people and the title of «Batyr». A detachment led by Bürgö Batyr during one of the Kazakh-Kyrgyz clashes ousted the Kazakhs in the vicinity of Lake Balkhash. 

The young state - the Khanate of Kokand also began to take an active part in the political situation in Kyrgyzstan. Bürgö rejected the title of «Datka» proposed by the Kokand Khan, so that he expressed his obedience and in response captured 2 Kokand fortresses of Oluya-Ata and Sayram. 

Bürgö Khan also conducted successful campaigns against Kashgar, but was fatally poisoned by a Kokand scout.

Tailak Khan

Tailak was born in 1796 in the area of Ak-Talaa. Tailak studied martial arts from childhood and grew up as an exemplary warrior. 

In the region of 1810-1820s, the Kazakhs who roamed near Taraz, who were part of the Khanate of Kokand, began to claim Kyrgyz territories. The leader of the Kazakhs, Edine, reached Suusamyr, but was defeated by Tailak Batyr,

Tailak also supported Jahangir Khoja in the uprisings against the Qing dynasty. Kyrgyz troops actively participated in the fighting in 1820, 1821-1822, 1826-1827, 1830. 

In 1820, the Qing detachment, whose number, according to various sources, varies from 500 to 7,000 soldiers, invaded the Kyrgyz territories and attacked Tailak's native pastures. Tailak, having gathered his detachment, began to pursue the Qing army and eventually drove them into the gorge, as a result, the entire army was killed, and the Qing general Bayan Batu committed suicide. 

In the 1820s, the Kyrgyz-Kokand war began, which lasted over 10 years. As a result of this war, the Tian Shan Kyrgyz were subjugated by the Khanate of Kokand, but not for long. In addition, the power of the Kokand Khans was not strong in the conquered territories; among the highest state officials, the majority of places were occupied by the Kyrgyz.

 

In 1830, it became known that the Qing dynasty was organizing a new campaign against the Kyrgyz, but Tailak Batyr quickly reacted and gathered an impressive force. Emperor Daoguang bestowed on him the title of «Border Lightning» and refused the campaign. 

In 1830 the Kyrgyz, led by Tailak Batyr, were able to stop the large forces of the Kokand Khans. The 7,000-strong army sent by the Khanate of Kokand could not break into the lands of the Tian Shan Kyrgyz. 

In 1832 Tailak Batyr led the resistance to the Khanate of Kokand. He captured the Kurtka fortress and freed all the prisoners, returning their property to them. Kokand Khan Muhammad Ali sent an army of 500 best warriors led by Arap Baghatur, a battle took place in the Jailoo-Bychan area, where a small detachment of Tailak won, and Tailak himself personally killed the enemy commander. 

Having convened a Kurultai, Tailak was proclaimed the Kyrgyz Khan for his military achievements and personal qualities. However, in 1838 he was mortally poisoned through a Kokand spy sent to him.

Rulers

Rulers of the Kyrgyz Khanate

Rulers of the Union of Kyrgyz Tribes
 Yellow — Two rulers at the same time
 Dark Green — Kyrgyz-Kazakh military union's rulers

Rulers of the North Kyrgyz Tribes

See also
History of Kyrgyzstan
Tagai Biy
Tailak Khan
Mamatkul Biy
Atake Biy

References 

History of Kyrgyzstan
Moghulistan
Chagatai Khanate
Kyrgyzstan
Former countries in Central Asia
Former monarchies of Asia
Khanates
States and territories established in 1470
States and territories established in 1484
1832 disestablishments in Asia
1838 disestablishments in Asia